RBSL may refer to:

 Regent's Business School London, a private business school in the United Kingdom
 Rheinmetall BAE Systems Land, a military vehicle defence contractor based in the United Kingdom